Alfie Hewett defeated Gordon Reid in the final, 1–6, 6–4, 7–5 to win the men's wheelchair tennis title at the 2017 Wheelchair Tennis Masters. 

Joachim Gérard was the two-time defending champion, but was defeated by Hewett in the semifinals.

Seeds

  Gustavo Fernández (round robin)
  Alfie Hewett (champion)
  Stéphane Houdet (round robin)
  Gordon Reid (final)
  Nicolas Peifer (round robin)
  Stefan Olsson (round robin)
  Joachim Gérard (semifinals, third place)
  Shingo Kunieda (semifinals, fourth place)

Draw

Finals

Group A

Group B

References

External links

Men's singles draw

Masters, 2017